The Garden of the Triple Alliance is a small garden and monument composed of three bronze castings representing the three Tlatoaque of the Aztec Triple Alliance, and made by the artist Jesús Fructuoso Contreras between 1888 and 1889. It is located on Filomeno Mata street (at the crossing with Tacuba street), west of the Zocalo in the historic center of Mexico City.

See also
 Monumento a la Raza (Mexico City), a pyramid featuring the castings.

References

Buildings and structures in Mexico City
Gardens in Mexico
Parks in Mexico City
Historic center of Mexico City
Indigenous peoples in Mexico City